The Institute for Computing in Humanities, Arts, and Social Science (I-CHASS) at the University of Illinois at Urbana–Champaign was established in 2005 to conduct leading-edge research at the intersection of high performance computing and humanities, arts, and social science scholarship. I-CHASS is hosted by the National Center for Supercomputing Applications (NCSA) and maintains strategic partnerships with NCSA, the Great Lakes Consortium for Petascale Computation (GLCPC), and the Illinois Informatics Institute (I3). Through its work on identifying, creating, and adapting computational tools that accelerate research and education, it engages scholars from the University of Illinois and from across the globe to demonstrate approaches to next-generation interdisciplinary research with high performance computing.

Directors
The Director of the Institute  is Vernon Burton, Professor of History, African American Studies, and Sociology at the University of Illinois at Urbana–Champaign. He is also the Associate Director for Humanities and Social Sciences and Senior Research Scientist at the National Center for Supercomputing Applications (NCSA).

The Executive Director is Kevin Franklin, Senior Research Scientist at the National Center for Supercomputing Applications (NCSA).

Digital projects
The institute sponsors a  number of digital projects in high performance computing and the humanities, arts, and social science.

References

External links
 I-CHASS website: http://chass.uiuc.edu
 NCSA website: http://ncsa.uiuc.edu
 University of Illinois at Urbana–Champaign: http://uiuc.edu

2005 establishments in Illinois
Digital Humanities Centers
Research institutes established in 2005
University of Illinois Urbana-Champaign centers and institutes